The Ngormburr, also known as Murumburr and other variants, are an Aboriginal Australian people of the Northern Territory.

Country

The area is now in Kakadu National Park, and the people are part of a group to whom native title was granted in March 2022.

Language
Their language was or is the Ngormbur language.

Alternative names
 Ngorm-bur.
 Ngumbu.
 Gnornbur.
 Ngorbur.
 Oormbur.
 Corm-bur.
 Koarnbut.
 Ambukuda.
 Ambugula.
 Numbugala.
 Nambuguja.

Notes

Citations

Sources

Aboriginal peoples of the Northern Territory